James T. Harrison (1903 – 1982) was an appointed Justice of the Montana Supreme Court, serving from 1957 to 1977. He graduated from St. Paul College of Law.

References

Justices of the Montana Supreme Court
1903 births
1982 deaths
William Mitchell College of Law alumni
20th-century American judges